The State Industrial Development Corporation of Uttarakhand Limited (SIDCUL) is a government of Uttarakhand enterprise which promotes industries and develops industrial infrastructure in the State. It also provides tax incentives for companies establishing plants on its industrial estates presently at Haridwar, Pantnagar and Sitarganj.

History
SIDCUL was incorporated as a Limited Company in the year 2002 with an authorised share capital of ₹50 crores and ₹20 crores paid up capital through the Government of Uttarakhand in order to promote industrial development and develop an industrial infrastructure

Besides the State Government, SIDCUL has equity participation from the Union Bank of India, the OBC and SIDBI. Other banks are also in the process of participating in its equity. This has led to more than a thousand EOI’s with SIDCUL, which entail an investment of around ₹20,000 crores.

Infrastructure developed by SIDCUL
 Integrated Industrial Estate at BHEL, Haridwar (near Shivalik Nagar)
 Integrated Industrial Estate at Pantnagar (Rudrapur)
 IT Park, Dehradun
 Pharma City - Selaqui Industrial Area, Dehradun
 Sigaddi Growth Centre, Kotdwar
 Integrated Industrial Estate, Sitarganj
 Integrated Industrial Estate, Escort Farm (Kashipur)

References

External links
 Official website

State industrial development corporations of India
State agencies of Uttarakhand
Economy of Uttarakhand
Companies based in Uttarakhand
Indian companies established in 2002
2002 establishments in Uttarakhand
Government agencies established in 2002